Cherlaksky District is an administrative and municipal district (raion), one of the thirty-two in Omsk Oblast, Russia. It is in the southeast of the oblast. Its administrative center is the urban locality (a work settlement) of Cherlak. Population: 30,344 (2010 Census);  The population of the administrative center accounts for 36.2% of the district's total population.

Notable residents 

Artyom Grabovoi (1983–2014), known as The Knyaze–Volkonskoye Maniac, serial killer

References

Notes

Sources

Districts of Omsk Oblast